Sidon (Ṣīḏōn) known locally as Sayda or Saida ( Ṣaydā), is the  third-largest city in Lebanon. It is located in the South Governorate, of which it is the capital, on the Mediterranean coast. Sidon has a population of about 80,000 within city limits, while its metropolitan area has more than a quarter-million inhabitants.

Name

The Phoenician name Ṣīdūn probably meant "fishery" or "fishing town". It is mentioned in Papyrus Anastasi I as Djedouna. It appears in Biblical Hebrew as Ṣīḏōn and in Syriac as Ṣidon. The name appears in Classical Arabic as Ṣaydūn and in Modern Arabic as Ṣaydā.

As a Roman colony, it was notionally refounded and given the formal name  to honour its imperial sponsor.

In the Book of Genesis, Sidon was the first-born son of Canaan, who was a son of Ham, thereby making Sidon a great-grandson of Noah.

History
In the years before Christianity, Sidon had many conquerors: Assyrians, Babylonians, Egyptians, Persians, Greeks, and finally Romans. Herod the Great visited Sidon. Both Jesus and Saint Paul are said to have visited it, too (see Biblical Sidon below). The city was eventually conquered by the Arabs and then by the Ottoman Turks.

Prehistory
Sidon has been inhabited since very early in prehistory. The archaeological site of Sidon II shows a lithic assemblage dating to the Acheulean, whilst finds at Sidon III include a Heavy Neolithic assemblage suggested to date just prior to the invention of pottery.

Late Bronze
Around 1350 BC, Sidon was part of the Egyptian Empire and ruled by Zimredda of Sidon. During the Amarna Period, Egypt went into decline, leading to uprising and turmoil in the Levant. There was rivalry between Lebanese coastal city-states fighting for dominance, with Abimilku of Tyre in the south, and Rib-Hadda of Byblos in the north. Byblos became significantly weakened as the dominant city on the Lebanese coast. Further north, the Akkar Plain rebelled and became the kingdom of Amurru with Hittite support. The Mitanni Empire, an ally of the Egyptians, had dominated Syria but now fell apart due to the military campaigns of Suppiluliuma I of Hatti. Tutankhamun and his general Horemheb scrambled to keep Egyptian control over southern Levant, as the Hittites became overlords in the north.

Iron Age

Sidon was one of the most important Phoenician cities, and it may have been the oldest. From there and other ports, a great Mediterranean commercial empire was founded. Homer praised the skill of its craftsmen in producing glass, purple dyes, and its women's skill at the art of embroidery. It was also from here that a colonising party went to found the city of Tyre. Tyre also grew into a great city, and in subsequent years there was competition between the two, each claiming to be the metropolis ('Mother City') of Phoenicia.

Glass manufacturing, Sidon's most important enterprise in the Phoenician era, was conducted on a vast scale, and the production of purple dye was almost as important. The small shell of the Murex trunculus was broken in order to extract the pigment that was so rare it became the mark of royalty.

In AD 1855, the sarcophagus of King Eshmun’azar II was discovered. From a Phoenician inscription on its lid, it appears that he was a "king of the Sidonians," probably in the 5th century BC, and that his mother was a priestess of ‘Ashtart, "the goddess of the Sidonians." In this inscription the gods Eshmun and Ba‘al Sidon 'Lord of Sidon' (who may or may not be the same) are mentioned as chief gods of the Sidonians. ‘Ashtart is entitled ‘Ashtart-Shem-Ba‘al, '‘Ashtart the name of the Lord', a title also found in an Ugaritic text.

Nebuchadnezzar II subjugated the city to be part of the Neo-Babylonian Empire. At the end of the Persian era, in 351 BC, Phoenicia was invaded by Artaxerxes III.

Persian and Hellenistic periods
Like other Phoenician city-states, Sidon suffered from a succession of conquerors, first by the Persian Achamenid empire in the 6th century BC, ending with its occupation by Alexander the Great in 333 BC, and the start of the Hellenistic era of Sidon's history. The Persian influence seems to have been profound, as is observed in the change of the architectural style of the city. Under the successors of Alexander, it enjoyed relative autonomy and organised games and competitions in which the greatest athletes of the region participated. In the Hellenistic-period necropolis of Sidon, important finds such as the Alexander Sarcophagus, the Lycian tomb and the Sarcophagus of the Crying Women were discovered, which are now on display at the Archaeological Museum of Istanbul.

Roman period

When Sidon fell under Roman domination, it continued to mint its own silver coins. The Romans also built a theater and other major monuments in the city. In the reign of Elagabalus, a Roman colony was established there. During the Byzantine period, when the great earthquake of AD 551 destroyed most of the cities of Phoenice, Beirut's School of Law took refuge in Sidon. The town continued quietly for the next century, until it was conquered by the Arabs in AD 636.

Crusader-Ayyubid period

On 4 December 1110, Sidon was captured after the siege of Sidon, a decade after the First Crusade, by King Baldwin I of Jerusalem and King Sigurd I of Norway. It then became the center of the Lordship of Sidon, an important vassal-state of the Kingdom of Jerusalem. Saladin captured it from the Crusaders in 1187, but German Crusaders restored it to Christian control in the Crusade of 1197. It would remain an important Crusader stronghold until it was finally destroyed by the Ayyubids in 1249. In 1260, it was again destroyed by the Mongols led by Kitbuqa. The remains of the original walls are still visible.

Ottoman period
After Sidon came under Ottoman Turkish rule in the early 16th century, it became the capital of the Sidon Eyalet (province) and regained a great deal of its earlier commercial importance. Starting in the 18th century the city was dominated by the Hammud family of notables, who monopolized the production and exporting of cotton in the region and built numerous palaces and public works in the city. The Hammuds also served as government customs agents and tax collectors for various Ottoman religious foundations.

During the Egyptian–Ottoman War, Sidon – like much of Ottoman Syria – was occupied by the forces of Muhammad Ali of Egypt. His ambitions were opposed by the British Empire, which backed the Ottomans. The British Admiral Charles Napier, commanding a mixed squadron of British, Turkish and Austrian ships, bombarded Sidon on 26 September 1840, and landed with the storming column. Sidon capitulated in two days, and the British went on to Acre. This action was recalled in two Royal Navy vessels being named .

From 1887 the Royal necropolis of Sido was extensively excavated by the Ottomans, and its treasured transferred to Istanbul (like the Alexander sarcophagus).

After World War I

After World War I it became part of the French Mandate of Lebanon. During World War II the city, together with the rest of Lebanon, was captured by British forces fighting against the Vichy French, and following the war it became a major city of independent Lebanon.

Following the Palestinian exodus in 1948, a considerable number of Palestinian refugees arrived in Sidon, as in other Lebanese cities, and were settled at the large refugee camps of Ein el-Hilweh and Mieh Mieh. At first these consisted of enormous rows of tents, but gradually houses were constructed. The refugee camps constituted de facto neighborhoods of Sidon, but had a separate legal and political status which made them into a kind of enclaves. At the same time, the remaining Jews of the city fled, and the Jewish cemetery fell into disrepair, threatened by coastal erosion.

On Easter Sunday, 19 April 1981, at least sixteen people were killed in Sidon after the (South Lebanon Army) SLA's long-range artillery indiscriminately shelled the city centre. It was reported that it was in response to a request from Bashir Gemayel in connection with ongoing Syrian attacks on Phalangist positions around Zahle. Israel denied involvement.

After the 1982 Israeli invasion of Lebanon Sidon was occupied by the Israeli army for almost two and a half years.

On 18 August 1997, following a roadside bomb near Jezzine which killed of two teenage members of a SLA leader's family, SLA artillery shelled Sidon killing seven civilians and wounding thirty-five. Hizbollah responded the following day by firing 60–80 rockets into the security zone and northern Israel. According to UNIFIL observers the missiles appeared to be targeted at uninhabited areas. The attack on Sidon is credited with leading to a truce between Hizbollah and Amal and increased cooperation between the two groups and the Lebanese Army. This was evident in the Ansariya ambush the following month.

On 8 June 1999 two gunmen entered the Palais de Justice, Sidon's main courthouse, and shot dead three magistrates and a chief prosecutor. The attackers escaped. No group claimed responsibility but suspicion focused on Osbat al-Ansar whose leader had been sentenced to death in absentia for the murder of the head of the Sufi Al-Ahbash movement and the attempted assassination of the mufti of Tripoli. He was believed to be in hiding in the Ain al-Hilwa refugee camp.

Sidon was a small fishing town of 10,000 inhabitants in 1900, but studies in 2000 showed a population of 65,000 in the city, and around 200,000 in the metropolitan area. The little level land around the city is used for cultivation of some wheat, vegetables, and fruits, especially citrus and bananas. The fishing in the city remains active with a newly opened fishery that sells fresh fish by bidding every morning. The ancient basin was transformed into a fishing port, while a small quay was constructed to receive small commercial vessels. (Refer to the "Old City" and the "Architecture and landscape" sections below.)

Saida Municipal Stadium was inaugurated in 2000 for the Asian Football Confederation's Cup 2000.

Politics

This sectarian and demographic division rose to the surface during the Lebanese Civil War, when armed clashes erupted between Sunni Muslims and Christians. The clashes ended with the surrender of the Christian front, and the Christians were forced to move to east Beirut. After the war ended in 1990, the Christians have gradually returned to their hometowns and in the year 2000 many fled to Israel.
 
The local politics of Sidon in the 20th century was mainly dominated up till the 1980s by allegiances around two main families, the El-Bizri and Saad. The El-Bizri politicians were known for their business connections, close ties with eminent Lebanese and Levantine leaders, and their bent on serving the Lebanese state as government ministers, officials and mayors. The Saad politicians tended to be populist and became engaged in violent protests in the 1940s, 1950s and then during the Lebanese civil war as Nasserites (populist followers of Nasser in Lebanon).

The local political conflict between these two families was always resolved through amicable means and ties of kinship. Their hold over the political aspects of the city was similar to that of Mediterranean families in Sicily or to being also influenced by the ties of Arab families, clans, and tribes in traditionalist forms. The most notable figures of the El-Bizri family in the first half of the 20th century were: Ahmad El-Bizri (born 1899), Salah El-Bizri, Eizeddine El-Bizri (commonly known as Eizzo) and Anwar El-Bizri (born 1910). These four brothers were businessmen and politicians who dominated the political life of the city up till the late 1940s, using traditional inherited forms of governance since Ottoman times. With intelligence and strength they maintained their power for over 50 years. It is from their ranks that Maarouf Saad started his public life, and their close cousins, Nazih El-Bizri, Amin El-Bizri, and Fouad El-Bizri became the next generation of politicians and statesmen in Lebanon; holding positions as ministers and members of parliament.

The El-Bizri and the Saad political practices were bent on social justice and on local service in public affairs. The El-Bizri were since the Ottoman rule bent on serving the state, and this continued with their loyalty and support to the successive governments of Lebanon since the times of independence. They also helped eminent politicians and statesmen from Sidonian descent such as the Prime Ministers Riad Solh, Takieddine el-Solh and Rashid Solh, they also gave their support to former Prime Minister Saeb Salam, father of Tamam Salam, Prime Minister 2014–2016. The presence of the El-Bizris was at times intimidating on the local scene, but they were also known for their goodwill and dignified public service.

The Saad family developed their links with Nasserism in the 1950s and engaged in the uprising and armed protest of 1958 against the government of the Lebanese President Chamoun. They also became involved in the civil war as part of the left wing politics of the Lebanon (Al-Haraka al-Wataniyya) with PLO connections, and they actively contributed to resisting the Israeli occupation after 1982. The Saads remained populist in their politics and focused on the grassroots, while the El-Bizri were generally appealing to the middle and upper classes. In the middle 1980s, the Hariri family started to rise to prominence and it became the most influential in Sidon in political and financial terms, even though the presence of the Saad and the El-Bizri in local politics remained significant at the level of visibility and activism.

The politics of Sidon is similar to that of the traditional old cities of the Levant in the sense of being family-based. In broad terms one could say that the El-Bizri family had an influence since Ottoman times, and most significantly during the entirety of the 20th century. It was local in impact at first, but then the members of this family became influential within the Lebanese state and institutions, and they supported the Solh family that had successive Prime Ministers and that moved its power base from Sidon to Beirut. The Saad family developed its original politics from within the sphere of influence of the El-Bizri family and then became a power to reckon with on its own after 1948, and most powerfully in 1958, then in the civil war and up till today.

Maarouf Saad, the leader of his family, and a local influential politician, was assassinated at the eve of the Lebanese civil war in 1975. The Saads retained their populism and grassroots appeal, and attracted a core of loyal adherents since the middle of the 20th century. While the El-Bizri were Levantine in their Arabism (namely focused mainly on Bilad al-Shaam in regional politics), and the Solh being also similar to them in this, the Saad were leaning more towards a broader pan-Arabism (Nasserite, Libyan, and then Syrian). As for the Hariri family, they are regionally focused on Saudi orientations in politics. The Hariri family started to rise to political and economic prominence in the 1980s and became perhaps the most influential family in Lebanon by the middle 1990s. It is now one of the most organised in political terms and it follows modern forms of political practice through a large party (Future Movement) that cuts across various economic classes but that is usually seen as a Sunni political movement with regional weight due to its close ties with Saudi Arabia.

Impact on Sidon of regional underdevelopment
According to a recent United Nations Development Programme (UNDP) report "data also point to an increase in urban poverty especially in Lebanon's largest cities suburbs such as Beirut, Tripoli and Saida, as illustrated by poverty-driven symptoms (child labour, over-crowding and deteriorated environment conditions)."

In another UNDP report, the author discusses the development predominance of Beirut over the rest of the regions of Lebanon (North, South and Beqaa) is a well-known imbalance that can be dated to the early 19th century. With the expansion of Beirut in the 1870s, urban growth in the future capital outpaced Tripoli and Saida. Transportation routes, missionary schools, universities and hospitals as well as the Beirut port development and the commerce of silk participated to the fortification of Beirut as a major trade center for Mediterranean exchange (ARNAUD 1993; LABAKI 1999: 23). However, the establishment of Great Lebanon in 1920, under the French mandate, added the poorer areas of the North (Akkar), Beqaa (Baalbak-Hermel) and the South (Jabal Aamel) to the relatively affluent cities of Mount Lebanon. This addition made of Lebanon a country composed of unequally developed regions. This legacy remains a heavy load to bear socially, culturally, economically and politically. Even though the public policies elaborated by the young Lebanese State were attempting to have regional perspectives, the early urban planning schemes reveal a development approach exclusively axed on Beirut and its suburbs.

The post war development policy of the State, promoted by Hariri government (1992–1998), was centered around balanced development and is widely inspired by the 1943 Pact and the 1989 Taef agreement (LABAKI1993: 104). However the application of this policy aims mainly at the rehabilitation and construction of roads and infrastructures (electricity, telephone, sewage). Another of its components is the rehabilitation of government buildings (airport, port, schools, universities and hospitals). Transportation projects (mainly concentrated on the coastal line) constitute 25% of the budget of 10-year economic plan developed by the CDR (BAALBAKI 1994: 90). However, all these projects are predominantly concentrated around Beirut, ignoring the regions.

The Former Makab (waste dump) and the Treatment Plant 
Near the southern entrance to the city used to be a 'rubbish mountain' called at the time by the locals the Makab; namely, a 600,000 cubic metre heap that reached the height of a four-story building. It was originally created to dispose of the remains of buildings destroyed in Israeli air strikes during the 1982 invasion, but it then became the main dump for the city. Growing out of the sea, it became an environmental hazard, with medical waste and plastic bags polluting nearby fishing grounds.

Sidon politicians, including the Hariri family, failed for decades to resolve the Makab crisis—which has endangered residents health (especially during episodic burning). In 2004, Engineer Hamzi Moghrabi, a Sidon native, conceived the idea to establish a treatment plant for the city's decades-old chronic waste problem. He established the privately funded IBC Enviro and the treatment plant became operational in 2013.

The Ministry of Environment came up with a $50,000+ plan to clean the whole area and transform the dump into a green space, along with other heaps in the country. Qamla beach in Sidon, a coast in close proximity to the Sea Castle, witnessed a large municipal cleanup in May 2011, as it was an easy target of rubbish being washed up by the Makab. These plans aim to revive the former glory of the city's coasts and attract tourists who avoided swimming in Sidon's sea before. The project of cleaning the region where the waste dump has already started, and currently a waves-barrier is being built, and the vast bulk of the waste dump being cleared.

Local government
The city of Sidon is administrated by the Municipality of Sidon. The municipality is constituted of a council of 21 members including the City Mayor and his Deputy. It has administrative and financial independence but remains under the control and supervision of the central government, specifically the Ministry of Interior. The municipality's jurisdiction is limited to a region of 786 hectares in area and 5 meters in elevation, while each of the city's suburbs is administrated by its own independent municipal council. Sidon is the center of the Governorate of South Lebanon, and hosts the seat of the Governor of Southern Lebanon. The city is also the center of the Sidon District and the Union of Sidon and Zahrani Municipalities (founded in 1978 and contains 15 municipalities). Sidon hosts the southern regional headquarters of a series of governmental facilities like the Central Bank of Lebanon, Électricité du Liban, Central Telecommunications Station and others. It is also the home of the Justice Palace of South Lebanon in its new headquarters on East Boulevard (the old headquarters were an old Ottoman Saray that is currently occupied by the LSF and is planned to be transformed into a cultural center by the municipality).

In the 2000 and 2005 parliamentary elections, the Sidon District along with the Tyre and Bint Jbeil districts formed the first electoral district of South Lebanon. However, in the 2009 elections – and due to the reactivation of the 1960 electoral law – the city of Sidon was separated from its district to form a separate electoral district.

Demographics
The overwhelming majority of Sidon's population belong to the Sunni sect of Islam, with few Shiites and Christians. 
Sidon is the seat of the Greek Melkite Catholic Archbishop of Sidon and Deir el Qamar, and has housed a significant Catholic population throughout its history. Sidon also hosts the seat of the Shiite Ayatollah of South Lebanon.

In the 1930s, when Lebanon was still under the French mandate, Sidon had the largest Jewish population in Lebanon, estimated at 3,588, compared to 3,060 in Beirut.

Main sights

 Sidon Sea Castle, a fortress built by the Crusaders in the early 13th century. It is located near the Port of Sidon.
 Sidon Soap Museum. It traces the history of the soap making in the region and its different manufacturing steps.
 Khan al-Franj ("Caravanserai of the French"), a complex built in the 16th century, though erroneously credited to Emir Fakhreddine in the 17th century. It gained its name for accommodating French merchants and goods in order to develop trade with Europe. This is a typical khan with a large rectangular courtyard and a central fountain surrounded by covered galleries.
 Debbane Palace, a historical residence built in 1721, an example of Arab-Ottoman architecture. It is currently in the process of being transformed into the History Museum of Sidon. This villa was earlier occupied by the Hammoud family in the 18th century and also by members of the famous Ottoman aristocrats of the Abaza clan in the late 19th century and early 20th century. The vaults at the ground level being originally stables for the villa residents and then turned into shops as part of the old souks, and known until recent time by association to the Abazas.
 The Castle of St. Louis (Qalaat Al Muizz). It was built by the Crusaders in the 13th century on top of the remains of a fortress built by the Fatimid caliph Al Muizz. It is located to the south of the Old Souks near Murex Hill.
 Eshmun Temple, dedicated to the Phoenician God of healing. Built in the 7th century BC, it is located in the north of Sidon near the Awali river.
 The British War Cemetery in Sidon. Opened in 1943 by units of His Majesty's (King George VI) British Forces occupying the Lebanon after the 1941 campaign against the Vichy French troops. It was originally used for the burial of men who died while serving with the occupation force, but subsequently the graves of a number of the casualties of the 1941 campaign were moved into the cemetery from other burial grounds or from isolated positions in the vicinity. The cemetery now contains 176 Commonwealth burials of the Second World War and nine war graves of other nationalities. It was designed by G. Vey. It is perhaps that only garden in modern Sidon that is elegantly kept and cared for. It is not a public garden but can be visited when the wardens have its gateways opened
Khan Sacy in Sidon: Khan Sacy has undergone a series of modifications and tells part of the city's past. In its heart, it hides a much older story. It is composed of rooms of a majestic height with three water wells, three hammams and an oven.

Education
Sidon is home to numerous educational facilities ranging from public elementary schools to private universities. According to a 2006 study, the city is home to 29 schools that serve a total of 18,731 students: 37% are in public schools, 63% are in private schools. Sidon also contains 10 universities, 5 of which are private universities.

Archaeology
The following archaeological sites in the area indicate settlements from the earliest prehistorical times.

Sidon I is an archaeological site located to the east of the city, south of the road to Jezzine. An assemblage of flint tools was found by P. E. Gigues suggested to date between 3800 and 3200 BC. The collection included narrow axes or chisels that were polished on one side and flaked on the other, similar to ones found at Ain Cheikh, Nahr Zahrani and Gelal en Namous. The collection appears to have gone missing from the Archaeological Museum of the American University of Beirut.

Sidon II is said to be "near the church" at approximately fifty meters above sea level. P. E. Gigues suggested that the industry found on the surface of this site dated to the Acheulean.

Sidon III was found by E. Passemard in the 1920s, who made a collection of material that is now in the National Museum of Beirut marked "Camp de l'Aviation". It includes large flint and chert bifacials that may be of Heavy Neolithic origin.

Sidon IV is the tell mound of ancient Sidon with Early Bronze Age (c. 3200 BC) deposits, now located underneath the ruined Saint Louis Castle and what are also thought to be the ruins of a Roman theater.

Bronze Age Sidon
In the area of this ruined Crusader castle, recent excavations uncovered a late Early Bronze Age I (EB I) settlement on bedrock. Here, an uninterrupted sequence from EB I to EB III was found. A modest third-millennium BC settlement consisting of domestic installations and tombs was also uncovered.<ref>Doumet-Serhal, C. 2010. "Sidon during the Bronze Age: Burials, Rituals and Feasting Grounds at 'College Site. '"Near Eastern Archaeology 73:114–129</ref> Yet the following history of Sidon was not clarified. Very little has been known about the location, extent, and significance of Middle Bronze Age (MBA) Sidon until recently.

Since the early 21st century, Tell el-Burak excavations have helped significantly in this area, because it was an active settlement during MBA, and quite well preserved. Tell el-Burak is located along the coast 9 km south from Sidon. Previously, there was a big gap in the history of this whole coastal area from the end of the Early Bronze Age until the middle of the 2nd millennium BC, when Sidon is first mentioned in the historical texts.

Archaeologists determined that Sidon was clearly the big power centre during MBA, controlling significant territory. So there appears to have been the "Kingdom of Sidon" that controlled el-Burak, and many other surrounding areas.

 Excavation history 
The area around Sidon contains a number of important necropoli (below in order of age, and noting their principal excavators):
 Dakerman (Roger Saidah, 1968–1969)
 Tambourit (Saidah, 1977)
 Magharet Abloun (Aimé Péretié, 1855; Ernest Renan, 1864; Georges Contenau, 1920)
 Ayaa (William King Eddy, 1887; Osman Hamdi Bey, 1892; Contenau, 1920)
 Ain al-Hilweh (Charles Cutler Torrey, 1919–1920)
 El-Merah (Contenau, 1920)
 Qrayé (Contenau, 1920)
 Almoun, (Conenau, 1924)
 El-Harah (Theodore Makridi, 1904; Contenau, 1924)
 Magharet Abloun, Greco-Roman part (Renan, 1864; Contenau, 1914–1924)
 Helalié/Baramié/Mar Elias (William John Bankes, 1816; Renan 1864; Contenau, 1914; M. Meurdrac & L. Albanèse, 1938–1939)

In indication of the high-profile of the old city of Sidon in archaeological expeditions, and mainly in the 19th century, in October 1860 the famous French scholar Ernest Renan was entrusted with an archaeological mission to Lebanon, which included the search for the antique parts of Sidon. The Phoenician inscriptions that he discovered, and his field data, were eventually published in his notebook the: Mission de Phénicie (1864–1874; Phoenician Expedition).

The St. Louis land-castle grounds were excavated in 1914–1920 by a French team. Then eastwards a new site was also excavated by another generation of French expeditions in the 1960s. This same site received renewed attention in 1998 when the Directorate General of Antiquities in Lebanon authorized the British Museum to begin excavations on this area of land that was specifically demarcated for archaeological research. This has resulted in published papers, with a special focus on studying ceramics.

The archaeological fieldwork was not fully undertaken since the independence of the Lebanon. The main finds are displayed in the National Museum in Beirut. The fieldwork was also interrupted during the long civil war period, and it is now resumed but at a timid and slow scale, and not involving major international expeditions or expertise. Perhaps this is also indicative of the general lack in cultural interests among the authorities of this city, and almost of the non-existence of notable intellectual activities in its modern life. There are signs that the locals are beginning to recognize the value of the medieval quarters, but this remains linked to minor individual initiatives and not a coordinated collective effort to rehabilitate it like it has been the case with Byblos, even though the old district of Sidon contains a great wealth in old and ancient architecture.

Biblical Sidon

Hebrew Bible/Old Testament
The Hebrew Bible describes Sidon in several passages:
 It received its name from the "first-born" of Canaan, the grandson of Noah.
 The Tribe of Zebulun has a frontier on Sidon
 It was the first home of the Phoenicians on the coast of Canaan, and from its extensive commercial relations became a "great" city.
 It was the mother city of Tyre. It lay within the lot of the tribe of Asher, but was never subdued.
 The Sidonians long oppressed Israel.
 From the time of David its glory began to wane, and Tyre, its "virgin daughter", rose to its place of pre-eminence.
 Solomon entered into a matrimonial alliance with the Sidonians, and thus their form of idolatrous worship found a place in the land of Israel.
 Jezebel was a Sidonian princess.
 It was famous for its manufactures and arts, as well as for its commerce.
 It is frequently referred to by the prophets.
 Elijah sojourned in Sidon, performing miracles (see also in the New Testament).

New Testament
See the exorcism of the Syrophoenician woman's daughter, which takes place on the coast, in the region of Sidon and Tyre. Then he returned from the region of Tyre, and went by way of Sidon towards the Sea of Galilee, in the region of the Decapolis
 From Sidon, at which his ship put in after leaving Caesarea, Paul finally sailed for Rome.

Sanchuniathon
 The account ascribed to the Phoenician historian Sanchuniathon makes Sidon a daughter of Pontus, son of Nereus. She is said there to have first invented musical song from the sweetness of her voice.

 Gallery 

International relations

Twin towns and sister cities

Sidon is twinned with:
  Constanța, Romania
  Sofia, Bulgaria
  Sochi, Russia

Notable people

In antiquity and the pre-modern era
Chronological list.
 Eumaeus, character from Greek mythology. In Homer, Eumaeus tells of having been kidnapped as child from Sidon, where his father was the king.
 Antipater of Sidon (2nd century BC), poet
 Zeno of Sidon (c. 150 – c. 75 BC), Epicurean philosopher born in Sidon
 Dorotheus of Sidon (1st century BC) Greek astrologer associated with Sidon
 Boethus of Sidon (c. 75 – c. 10 BC), peripatetic philosopher
 Tiberius Julius Abdes Pantera, Roman soldier who, according to his grave found in Germany in the 19th century, was born in Sidon
 Zenobius and his sister Zenobia, early-Christian martyrs executed around AD 290 under Diocletian
 Gymnasius (Γυμνάσιος), a sophist in the time of the Emperor Constantine
 Euthymios Saifi (1643–1723), Melkite Catholic Bishop of Sidon and Tyre

In the modern era
 Ghaleb Kassab, co-founder of Visit Saida, and digital promoter of Saida.
 Adel Osseiran, co-founder of modern Lebanon, was a prominent Lebanese statesman, a former Speaker of the Lebanese Parliament, and one of the founding fathers of the Lebanese Republic.
 Raymond Audi, international banker, and former Minister of Refugees in the government of Lebanon (Originally Palestinian)
 Ali Osseiran, Member of Parliament and Former Minister
 Afif al-Bizri, (Afif El-Bizri) former Chief of Staff of the Syrian armed forces with a high-standing military rank and political profile during the Syria-Egypt republican union of the Nasser era.
 Mousbah Baalbaki, contemporary male belly dancer
The Four Brothers - Riad El Bizri's Sons:
Ahmad El-Bizri, Salah-Eddine El-Bizri (Mayor of Sidon from 1937 till 1951. Member of Parliament from 1951 till 1953), Ezzedine El-Bizri, Anwar El-Bizri.
 Hisham El-Bizri, filmmaker, producer, professor
 Nader El-Bizri, philosopher, architect
 Nazih El Bizri, longstanding politician: mayor of Sidon from 1952 till 1959, Member of Lebanese Parliament from 1953 till 1958 and from 1972 till 1992. Lebanese Minister of Health, and Minister of Social Affairs from 1955 till 1956, then from 1972 till 1973, and from 1980 till 1982.
 Rafic Hariri, former Prime Minister, billionaire and international businessman
 Bahia Hariri, former Minister of Education in the governments of Lebanon and philanthropist
 Saad Hariri, youngest former Prime Minister of Lebanon
 Bahaa Hariri, international businessman and billionaire, son of Rafic Hariri
 Ahmad Hijazi (born 1994), Lebanese footballer
 Sheikh Mohamad Osseiran, Jaafari Mufti of Sidon
 Maarouf Saad, former deputy representing Sidon in the national parliament and founder of the Popular Nasserite Party
 Fouad Siniora, former Prime Minister of Lebanon, minister of finance, and member of parliament
 Riad Solh, former Prime Minister of Lebanon
 Sami Solh, former Prime Minister of Lebanon
 Fayza Ahmed (Al-Rawwass), Arab singer formerly based in Egypt
 Paul Watkins (born 1950), former Manson family member lived in Sidon during his childhood (d.1990)
 Hussein Zein (born 1995), Lebanese footballer

See also

 Sidon Eyalet (Ottoman era)
 Kfar Beit
 Kitbuqa
 Zimredda (Sidon mayor)
 Amarna letter EA 144
 Tabnit sarcophagus
 Eshmunazar II sarcophagus
 Abdashtart I
 Evagoras II
 Abdalonymus

References

Sources
 
 Additional notes taken from Collier's Encyclopedia (1967 edition)
 
 

Further reading
Aubet, Maria Eugenia. The Phoenicians and the West: Politics, Colonies and Trade. 2d ed. Translated by Mary Turton. Cambridge, UK: Cambridge University Press, 2001.
Markoe, Glenn. Phoenicians. Vol. 2, Peoples of the Past. Berkeley: University of California Press, 2000.
Moscati, Sabatino. The World of the Phoenicians''. London: Phoenix Giant, 1999.

External links

 Sidon On Google Maps Street View By Paul Saad
 Sidonianews (Sidon News Portal) 
 Lebanon, the Cedars' Land: Sidon
 Sidon excavations
 Ancient Phoenician Sidon (Saida) in Lebanon

Sidon
Mediterranean port cities and towns in Lebanon
Populated coastal places in Lebanon
Populated places in Sidon District
Shia Muslim communities in Lebanon
Sunni Muslim communities in Lebanon
Archaeological sites in Lebanon
4th-millennium BC establishments
Coloniae (Roman)
Heavy Neolithic sites
Hebrew Bible cities
Hellenistic colonies
Phoenician cities
Phoenician sites in Lebanon
Populated places established in the 4th millennium BC
Torah cities
Former kingdoms
Tourist attractions in Lebanon
Tourism in Lebanon